Stefan Barucha (born 3 April 1977) is a German bobsledder. He competed in the four man event at the 2002 Winter Olympics.

References

External links
 

1977 births
Living people
German male bobsledders
Olympic bobsledders of Germany
Bobsledders at the 2002 Winter Olympics
People from Hennigsdorf
Sportspeople from Brandenburg
20th-century German people
21st-century German people